Gettin' Together! is an album recorded in 1960 by Paul Gonsalves. AllMusic's Scott Yanow awarded the album 4 1/2 stars. He wrote "The music is straight-ahead and shows that Gonsalves was quite capable of playing with younger "modernists"." The Penguin Guide to Jazz Recordings describes it as “a remarkable album, beautifully played and recorded.”

It was voted number 1 in the 50 All-Time Overlooked Jazz Albums from Colin Larkin's All Time Top 1000 Albums.

Track listing
"Yesterdays" (Otto Harbach/Jerome Kern) - 3.32 
"J. And B. Blues" (Joe Livramento) 4:57
"I Surrender, Dear" (Harry Barris, Gordon Clifford) 4:22  
"Hard Groove" (Paul Gonsalves) 4:57
"Low Gravy" (Jelly Roll Morton) 7:51 
"I Cover the Waterfront" (Johnny Green, Edward Heyman) 4:06
"Gettin' Together" (Babs Gonzalez) 4:54 
"Walkin"' (Richard Carpenter) 4:45

Personnel
Paul Gonsalves - Tenor Saxophone 
Nat Adderley - Cornet, except #3, 6 & 8
Wynton Kelly - Piano 
Sam Jones - Bass 
Jimmy Cobb - Drums

References

1961 albums
Paul Gonsalves albums
Jazzland Records (1960) albums
Albums produced by Orrin Keepnews